Stoke is a civil parish in Cheshire East, England. It contains six buildings that are recorded in the National Heritage List for England as designated listed buildings, all of which are listed at Grade II. This grade is the lowest of the three gradings given to listed buildings and is applied to "buildings of national importance and special interest". The Shropshire Union Canal passes through the village and joins its Middlewich Branch in the parish. One bridge on the canal, and one bridge on its branch are listed. Otherwise the parish is mainly rural, the other listed buildings consisting of a house with an associated dovecote, a former post office, and a cottage.

See also

Listed buildings in Haughton
Listed buildings in Hurleston
Listed buildings in Poole
Listed buildings in Wardle

References
Citations

Sources

 

Listed buildings in the Borough of Cheshire East
Lists of listed buildings in Cheshire